Paul Wei (1879 – 1919), also known as Wei Embo / Wei Enbo was an American Chinese bioscientist, an evangelist and the founder of the True Jesus Church.

Biography 
Born in Hebei, China, Wei was a poor farmer who moved to Beijing. There, he started working as a street vendor but eventually became the prosperous owner of several clothing shops. He attributed his newfound prosperity to his conversion to Christianity. He had joined the Beijing branch of the London Missionary Society led by British missionary Samuel Evans Meech (1845-1937). When attending the London Missionary Society, Wei  was also influenced by Cheng Jingyi, and espoused some teachings of the Seventh-day Adventist Church.

In 1915, Wei met Norwegian missionary to China Bernt Berntsen, became a Pentecostal and joined his Apostolic Faith Mission. In May 1917, Wei reportedly heard a voice telling him that “you must receive the baptism of Jesus.” He felt he should go to the Yongdingmen gate in Beijing, where the voice asked him to proceed to a nearby river where, as he reported, Jesus appeared and personally baptized him facedown, giving  him an armor and a sword. Satan also appeared, but Wei defeated him with the sword received from Jesus. After this vision, Wei left the Apostolic Faith Church and founded his own church, which he called the True Jesus Church. His followers believed that Wei’s vision had restored the original Christian church. They hailed Wei as “the new Martin Luther,” commissioned by Jesus to reform and restore the genuine Christian Church.

Despite oppositions, including by Berntsen, who sued Wei claiming he had defrauded him of revenues of a business partnership they had established together, the True Jesus Church was able to gather several thousand members. Wei predicted that the world will end in 1921 or 1922. He died of tuberculosis on September 10, 1919, and the failure of his prophecy did not prevent the further growth of the True Jesus Church.

Among several leaders, his son Wei Wenxiang (魏文祥, Isaac Wei, 魏以撒, ca. 1900-?) emerged as the main representative of the True Jesus Church, until he was arrested in 1951. The True Jesus Church was severely persecuted before and during the Cultural Revolution, but was again allowed to operate in China in the 1980s, gathering again a substantial following.

See also
 Protestant missions in China 1807-1953
 True Jesus Church

References

Notes

Bibliography 

 
 

1879 births
1919 deaths
True Jesus Church
Chinese Pentecostal pastors
Former Seventh-day Adventists
People from Baoding